Collars and Cuffs is a 1923 American silent comedy film starring Stan Laurel.

Cast
 Stan Laurel - Laundry worker
 Mark Jones - Foreman
 Eddie Baker - Laundry worker
 Katherine Grant - Laundry worker
 Jack Ackroyd - Laundry worker
 George Rowe - Pedestrian
 Sammy Brooks - Laundry worker

See also
 List of American films of 1923

References

External links

1923 films
American silent short films
American black-and-white films
1923 comedy films
1923 short films
Films directed by George Jeske
Silent American comedy films
American comedy short films
1920s American films
1920s English-language films